The Campeonato da Região Sul-Fronteira, commonly known as the Copa Sul-Fronteira, is an annual competition organized by the Rio Grande do Sul state football federation for clubs that are in the first, second and third divisions of the Campeonato Gaúcho and are located in the southern half of the state. It is held in the second half of the year and usually clubs participating in the higher levels of the Campeonato Brasileiro do not participate with the first team squad, using his academy.

The competition was founded in 2013, being a qualifying tournament for the Super Copa Gaúcha, where the winner ensures participation in the Campeonato Brasileiro Série D of the following year. The Copa Sul-Fronteira occasionally receive a different name, honoring important people related to football in Rio Grande do Sul. The 2014 edition is called Copa Ivânio Branco de Araújo, in posthumous tribute to former Brasil (PE) president who died in November 2012.

The current holders are Pelotas, having beaten their biggest rival Brasil (PE) by criterion of goal away after 2–2 aggregate in the 2013 finals. With this title, the Pelotas became the first winner of the Copa Sul-Fronteira in history.

History

Over the past decades, one of the major problems of Brazilian football has been the lack of an annual schedule for smaller clubs. These teams usually played in the state leagues and in the rest of the year closed, only reopening in the following year. Thus, FGF decided to create new competitions for this to not occur more, creating three regional tournaments: the Copa Sul-Fronteira, the Copa Metropolitana and the Copa Serrana. Along with the traditional domestic cup, the Copa FGF, the winners qualify for the Super Copa Gaúcha, where the four clubs play a qualification for the Campeonato Brasileiro Série D and also a place in the dispute of the state supercup, the Recopa Gaúcha, against the champion of the Campeonato Gaúcho.

The first edition of the Copa Sul-Fronteira was held in the second half of 2013, with the participation of five clubs of the southern half of the state. The finals was played between Pelotas, winner of the first round, and Brasil (PE), winner of the second round. The Pelotas won by criterion of goal away after 2–2 aggregate, winning the first title.

Format

Competition
In the first stage, all teams face off in round-robin, which will qualify the top four for the next phase, known as the semi-finals. At this stage, the first placed facing the fourth place and second place playing against the third placed in two matches each. The winners face off in the final two matches to define the winner of the competition.

Qualification for competitions
The Copa Sul-Fronteira winners qualify for the Super Copa Gaúcha, where it will have the opportunity to qualify for next year's Campeonato Brasileiro Série D. The winner of the Super Copa Gaúcha also dispute the Recopa Gaúcha, against the winner of Campeonato Gaúcho at the beginning of next season.

Clubs
Having been established in 2013, the Copa Sul-Fronteira is played by clubs located in the southern half of the Rio Grande do Sul and compete in the first, second or third division of the Campeonato Gaúcho. In some cases, clubs of the Metropolitan Porto Alegre compete in the cup, usually Grêmio or Internacional, to theoretically equal the competitions and let everyone on equal conditions. The following seven clubs will compete in the Copa Sul-Fronteira during the 2014 edition.

Records and statistics

List of champions
Below is the complete list of winners and runners-up of the competition.

Goalscorers
Are exposed here the goalscorers of all editions of the competition.

See also
Campeonato Gaúcho
Campeonato Gaúcho Série A2
Campeonato Gaúcho Série B
Recopa Gaúcha
Super Copa Gaúcha
Copa FGF
Copa Metropolitana
Copa Serrana

References

External links
FGF website. Federação Gaúcha de Futebol.

State football cup competitions in Brazil
Football competitions in Rio Grande do Sul